Andinoacara coeruleopunctatus, is a species of fish in the family Cichlidae in the order Perciformes, found in Central America on both the Atlantic slope of Panama and the Pacific slope of Costa Rica in the Coto River.

Description

Males can reach a length of  total in length.

Spawning
The fish is an open bottom spawner which produces eggs by the hundreds. Both parents care for their eggs and fry until the fry are free-swimming for a week.

References

Bibliography 
 Kullander, S.O., 2003. Cichlidae (Cichlids). p. 605-654. In R.E. Reis, S.O. Kullander and C.J. Ferraris, Jr. (eds.) Checklist of the Freshwater Fishes of South and Central America. Porto Alegre: EDIPUCRS, Brasil.

coeruleopunctatus
Taxa named by Rudolf Kner
Fish described in 1863